Asura hermanni is a moth of the family Erebidae. It was described by Lars Kühne in 2007. It is found in the Democratic Republic of the Congo.

References

Moths described in 2007
hermanni
Insects of the Democratic Republic of the Congo
Moths of Africa
Endemic fauna of the Democratic Republic of the Congo